Rolf Cahn (August 14, 1924 – August 1, 1994) was an American folk musician, martial arts teacher, author, and social activist. Born in Germany, he and his family, who were Jewish, fled from Adolf Hitler's oppression and arrived in the United States in 1937. They settled in Detroit, Michigan. Cahn later moved to Cambridge, Massachusetts, and thence to Berkeley, California and on to Santa Fe, New Mexico.

Folk music career
Cahn played guitar and recorded several albums of folk music during the time he lived in Berkeley. He was married for a time to the folk and blues singer Barbara Dane, and their son, Jesse Cahn, also became a folk musician.

In 1962 Cahn was one of the co-founders (with Debbie Green and Howard Ziehm) of The Cabale, at 2504 San Pablo Avenue in Berkeley, a folk club that featured performers like Mississippi John Hurt, Jesse Fuller, Elizabeth Cotten, Lightnin' Hopkins, and The Chambers Brothers. The Cabale closed in mid 1965.

K'ang jo fu
Cahn popularized a self-defense technique called k'ang jo fu  (also known as kang jo fu or "the kang") in his 1974 book K'ang Jo Fu: Self Defense for Gentle People.

K'ang jo fu can loosely be translated as "the way of health". Cahn learned the martial art from a visiting Chinese professor at UC Berkeley, Ch'eng Hsue' Yi in 1943. Ch'eng returned to China and Rolf continued to study and teach kang. One of his students, Robert Rawlings, described as a young boy in the introduction of Cahn's 1974 book, taught kang jo fu to martial artist and acupuncturist Charles Peri, who continues to teach kang jo fu in Novato, California. Although kang jo fu is based on a 95-movement form, it does not attach its movements to any ideology or scenario and can be described as pure form. It is described as placing a practitioner inside of everyone else's time and all directions (like bagua and xinyi).

Discography
 A Night at The Ashgrove (World Pacific, 1958)
 California Folk Concert with Rolf Cahn (Folkways Records, 1959)
 Rolf Cahn and Eric Von Schmidt (Folkways, 1961)
 If You Ain't Got The Do-Re-Mi (Smithsonian Folkways, 2007)

Death
Cahn died in Santa Fe, New Mexico, where he had been living for many years and was a well-loved local personality.

References

External links
 Cahn Discography at Smithsonian Folkways
 Interview of Texas bluesman Mance Lipscomb by Rolf Cahn and Phil Huffman on Pacifica's KPFA, July 16, 1963 (Internet Archives)

American folk musicians
American martial artists
Jewish emigrants from Nazi Germany to the United States
Musicians from Berkeley, California
Musicians from New Mexico
1924 births
1994 deaths
Writers from Berkeley, California
Place of birth missing
Musicians from Detroit
20th-century American musicians